In graph theory, Grassmann graphs are a special class of simple graphs defined from systems of subspaces. The vertices of the Grassmann graph  are the -dimensional subspaces of an -dimensional vector space over a finite field of order ; two vertices are adjacent when their intersection is -dimensional.

Many of the parameters of Grassmann graphs are -analogs of the parameters of Johnson graphs, and Grassmann graphs have several of the same graph properties as Johnson graphs.

Graph-theoretic properties 

 For all , the intersection of any pair of vertices at distance  is -dimensional.

Automorphism group 
There is a distance-transitive subgroup of  isomorphic to the projective linear group . 

Intersection array 
As a consequence of being distance-transitive,   is also distance-regular.
  for all .
  for all .

Spectrum 
 .

See also
 Grassmannian
 Johnson graph

References 

Parametric families of graphs
Regular graphs